Wilhelm Tolmé Runge (June 10, 1895 – June 9, 1987) was an electrical engineer and physicist who had a major involvement in developing radar systems in Germany.

Early life
Wilhelm Runge was born and raised in Hanover, where his father, Carl Runge, was a well-known professor of mathematics at the Technische Hochschule Hannover (now remembered chiefly as the co-eponym of the Runge–Kutta method).

Military service
When World War I started in 1914, Runge was not doing well in his engineering studies. In 1915 he volunteered to join the  German Army. Unsuccessful in officer training, he was sent to the  Western Front and the infamous trench warfare.
a seismic apparatus.

Education
At the close of the war, Runge, now highly motivated by his adverse military experience, returned to academic studies. He eventually earned the Doctor of Engineering (Electrical) degree from the Technical University at Darmstadt, and was later in life also awarded the higher academic degree (the Habilitation) in physics from the University of Göttingen. In 1923, while pursuing his academic studies, he started working at Telefunken, and in 1926, joined their development laboratory in Berlin.

Nationalism
In the early 1930s, Aryanization and Nationalism took a strong hold in Telefunken. While there is no evidence that Runge was personally involved in this, he was being promoted rapidly, so he must have been at least aware of the situation. If this was the case, it was ironic; Dr. Richard Courant, the man who ‘saved’ him from the trenches during World War I and at this point his brother in law, was himself a Jew and had to flee Germany.

Research
At Telefunken's development laboratory, Runge experimented with high-frequency transmitters and had the tube department working on cm-wavelength devices. In the summer of 1935, Runge, now Director of Telefunken's Radio Research Laboratory, initiated an internally funded project in radio-based detection technology. A-50 cm (600-MHz) receiver and 0.5-W transmitter were built, both using Barkhausen–Kurz tubes. With the antennas placed flat on the ground some distance apart, he arranged for an aircraft to fly overhead and found that the receiver gave a strong Doppler-beat interference signal.

Runge, with Hans Hollmann as a consultant, then developed a 1.8-m (170-MHz) system using pulse-modulation. Wilhelm Stepp, an engineer on the research staff, designed a transmit-receive device (a duplexer) for allowing a common antenna. Stepp also code-named the system Darmstadt after his home town, starting the practice in Telefunken of naming systems after cities. The Darmstadt, with only a few watts transmitter power, was first tested in February 1936, detecting an aircraft at about 5-km (3-mi) distance. This led the Luftwaffe (German Air Force) to fund Telefunken for the development of a 50-cm (600-MHz) gun laying system, the Würzburg.

Development for military uses
Telefunken received a contract from the Luftwaffe in late 1938 to build the Würzburg for supporting anti-aircraft guns. The transmitter had a 2-μs pulse width and a pulse repetition frequency (PRF) of about 4 kHz; the antenna used a 3-m parabolic reflector built by the Zeppelin Company. The Würzburg was demonstrated to Adolf Hitler in July 1939. Runge was justifiably proud of this system; it came to be the primary mobile, gun-laying system used by the Luftwaffe and the Heer (German Army) during World War II.

In early 1941, the Luftverteidigung (Air Defense) recognized the need for Funkmessgerät on their night-fighter aircraft. The requirements were given to Runge at Telefunken, and by the summer a prototype system was tested. Code-named Lichtenstein, this was a 62-cm (485-MHz), 1.5-kW system, generally based on the technology now well established by Telefunken for the Würzburg. The Lichtenstein had an excellent 200-m minimum range (important for air-to-air combat) and a 4-km maximum range. The first production models became available from Telefunken in February 1942.

Aviation research
In 1943, Runge was appointed to head the Luftfahrtforschungsanstalt (Aviation Research Institute) in Braunschweig. At the close of World War II in May 1945, he returned to Telefunken, which was located in the West Berlin occupied area. Here he spent the next several years in rebuilding the engineering department. In 1955, Runge was awarded the Habilitation (higher academic degree), earning him the title of Professor. Until his retirement in 1963, he established and managed the Telefunken Research Institute in Ulm.

References

Sources
 Brown, Louis; A Radar History of World War II, Inst. of Physics Publishing, 1999, 
 Muller, Werner; Ground Radar Systems of the German Luftwaffe to 1945, Schiffer Publishing, Ltd., 1998, 
 Swords, Seán S.; Technical History of the Beginnings of Radar, Peter Peregrinus Ltd., 1986, 
 Watson, Raymond C., Jr,; Radar Origins Worldwide, Trafford Publishers, 2009, 
 Literature by and about Wilhelm Tolmé Runge in the catalog of the German National Library

External links
 Bauer, Arthur O.; “Some Aspects of German Airborne Radar Technology, 1942 to 1945,” DEHS Autumn Symposium, Sheivenham, Oct. 2006; http://www.cdcandt.org/airborne_radar.htp
 Goebel, Gregory V.; “The Wizard War: WW2 & The Origins of Radar,” a book-length document; http://www.vectorsite.net/ttwiz.html
 Hepcke, Gerhard; “The Radar War, 1930-1945,” translated by Hannah Liebmann; M. Holliman; http://www.radarwar.org/radarwar.pdf

Engineers from Hanover
German electrical engineers
History of telecommunications in Germany
20th-century German physicists
Radar pioneers
1895 births
1987 deaths
Technische Universität Darmstadt alumni
Telecommunications in World War II